Todor Kyuchukov (born 6 September 1978 in Parvomay) is a former Bulgarian footballer who played as a goalkeeper.

References

External links

1978 births
Living people
Bulgarian footballers
People from Parvomay
Association football goalkeepers
First Professional Football League (Bulgaria) players
Primeira Liga players
Cypriot First Division players
PFC CSKA Sofia players
PFC Marek Dupnitsa players
PFC Cherno More Varna players
SK Sigma Olomouc players
PFC Rodopa Smolyan players
S.C. Beira-Mar players
Nea Salamis Famagusta FC players
FC Sportist Svoge players
PFC Kom-Minyor players
FC Bansko players
OFC Bdin Vidin players
Expatriate footballers in Russia
Expatriate footballers in Portugal
Expatriate footballers in Cyprus
Expatriate footballers in Greece
Expatriate footballers in the Czech Republic
Bulgarian expatriates in Portugal
FC Elista players
Bulgarian expatriates in the Czech Republic